Glenbar is a populated place situated in Graham County, Arizona, United States.

References

External links
 Glenbar or Matthews or Fairview – ghosttowns.com

Populated places in Graham County, Arizona
Ghost towns in Arizona